The Aberto de São Paulo is a defunct tennis tournament played on outdoor hard courts. It was part of the ATP Challenger Tour. It was held annually at the Parque Villa Lobos in São Paulo, Brazil, since 2001.

All the Brazilian single title winning players have multiple victories, with the exception of João Souza who won the last edition. The record is detained in the single discipline by Ricardo Mello, and by André Sá in the double, both with four wins.
In 2006 Brazilian player Flávio Saretta won both singles and doubles titles.

Past finals

Singles

Doubles

External links
Official website
ITF search

 
ATP Challenger Tour
Hard court tennis tournaments
Sport in São Paulo
Tennis tournaments in Brazil
Defunct tennis tournaments in Brazil